The Bristol Type 170 Superfreighter Mk 32 was a larger, stretched version of the Bristol Freighter designed for Silver City Airways for use on the short air ferry routes to France.

Production and operation
The first Superfreighters, with a longer -  - hold than the earlier Mark 31, were delivered to Silver City Airways in spring 1953 and were used on cross-channel services to Europe. One example was converted to a 60-seat all-passenger "Super Wayfarer".

The Mark 32 could carry 20 passengers instead of 12 in the smaller Mark 31 Freighter, and three cars instead of two in its air ferry role.

The Superfreighter was distinguishable from the earlier Freighter by having a longer nose, in which the extra car was carried, and a fin fillet as well as rounded wingtips.

A British United Air Ferries Superfreighter appears in the 1966 comedy film That Riviera Touch as the means by which Morecambe and Wise travel abroad with their car. The aircraft also appears in the 1965 film "Hysteria".

Operators
 Air Charter
 Air Ferry
 British Air Ferries (BAF)
 British United Air Ferries (BUAF)
 Channel Air Bridge
 Compagnie Air Transport
 Lambair
 Midland Air Cargo
 SABENA
 Silver City Airways

Specifications (Freighter Mk 32)

References

Further reading

External links 
 A picture of a BUAF Superfreighter at Lydd Ferryfield.

1950s British cargo aircraft
Superfreighter
High-wing aircraft
1950s British airliners
Aircraft first flown in 1953
Twin piston-engined tractor aircraft